is a former Japanese football player.

Playing career
Hirata was born in Yamaguchi on May 16, 1966. After graduating from Waseda University, he joined Japan Soccer League Division 2 club Mazda (later Sanfrecce Hiroshima) in 1989. He debuted in 1990 and he played many matches instead many players for injury. The club also was promoted to Division 1 at the end of the 1990–91 season. In 1993, he moved to the Czech 2. Liga club Švarc Benešov. In 1994, he returned to Japan and joined his local club Yamaguchi Teachers in Regional Leagues. In 1995, he moved to the Japan Football League club Otsuka Pharmaceutical. He retired at the end of the 1998 season.

Coaching career
After retirement, Hirata started coaching career at Otsuka Pharmaceutical (later Tokushima Vortis) in 1999. He mainly served as coach for top team and manager for youth team.

References

1966 births
Living people
Waseda University alumni
Association football people from Yamaguchi Prefecture
Japanese footballers
Japan Soccer League players
J1 League players
Japan Football League (1992–1998) players
Sanfrecce Hiroshima players
Renofa Yamaguchi FC players
Tokushima Vortis players
Association football forwards